The 2019–2020 Maltese protests started in Valletta and other urban centres of Malta on 20November 2019, mainly calling for resignations after alleged political links to the assassination of journalist and blogger Daphne Caruana Galizia surfaced following the arrest of businessman Yorgen Fenech. The protesters also targeted government corruption and the lack of action on money laundering. The protests consisted of demonstrations, marches, sit-ins, and civil disobedience and have been unprecedented in Malta's political history since its independence from the United Kingdom.

As of December 2019 the Maltese government was accused of using intimidation tactics against protesters and journalists. Caruana Galizia's family accused Muscat of trying to shield members of the inner circle from the investigations.  Organisers contested claims that protests were violent in any way, while an official spokesperson said that some protesters did "resort to violence, abuse and incitement."

On the 1st of December 2019, Prime Minister Joseph Muscat announced that he would resign on 12 January 2020. Constitutional experts, legal bodies, and other representatives stated that Muscat's decision to remain in office until January 2020 and to have a more than six-week Parliamentary recess over Christmas led to the crisis within Maltese institutions. The Caruana Galizia family, political parties, the European Union mission in Malta, academics, NGOs, civil society, the University of Malta students' union, former advisers, industrial organisations, and organised business and labour unions called for his immediate resignation. On 13 January 2020, Joseph Muscat resigned, satisfying one of the protestors' main demands.

As of December 2019 businesses were negatively affected by both the crisis and the protests, while major industrial associations and institutions expressed concern at the impact of the turmoil.

Background

Malta's political context 
Malta, an island nation of nearly 500,000 citizens, gained its independence from Great Britain in 1964, and its people subsequently declared it a Republic in 1974. It has largely been viewed as a nation of general geopolitical neutrality (since 1979), but also of extraordinarily impressive democratic voter participation. Its modern governmental body - a unicameral chamber known as the House of Representatives - was predominated by a two-party system, of which the Labour Party, led by Prime Minister Joseph Muscat, holds the majority of seats.

Despite several markers of socioeconomic success, such as its high life expectancy of 81 and its classification as an advanced society according to the IMF and UN (along with 32 other nations worldwide), public perception of Malta's public servants has been marred by allegations of corruption. This has resulted in a worse Corruption Perceptions Index compared to several other similar small economically advanced nations like Denmark, Singapore, Luxembourg, New Zealand, and Hong Kong. In recent years, investigative journalists have increasingly reported on allegations of money laundering, tax evasion via offshore havens (including those connected with the Panama Papers), nepotism, and various other indications of bribery and fraud; journalists are protected pursuant to Malta's Constitutional law on free press and free speech.

Leaders of both parties, including Muscat and the opposition party's Adrian Delia, were commonly the subjects of critique.

Daphne Caruana Galizia's assassination and civil response 
Daphne Caruana Galizia garnered international reputation as a resolute critic of political and business malpractice, despite being targeted by several SLAPP suits. Throughout 2017, she released a series of controversial and sensitive pieces of information that link a number of Maltese politicians to the Panama Papers. She was subsequently assassinated with a bomb installed into her car, on 16 October 2017. At the time of her death, she was fighting 48 libel suits.

Thousands of people attended a vigil in Caruana Galizia's hometown of Sliema the night of her murder. A series of monthly protests and vigils in remembrance of Caruana Galizia were held by civil society organisations on every sixteenth day of the month from October 2017 onward, in addition to ongoing anti-corruption protests and marches. These demonstrations, in opposition of secretive Panama accounts being opened by Maltese officials, had been consistently and formally organised for years leading up to Caruana Galizia's death. However, protests in Malta – some of them spontaneous – fundamentally transformed in meaning following her assassination, and evolved and intensified as more information about her murder has surfaced, implicating businessmen and politicians alike.

Her death was covered by international media, and the name Caruana Galizia began trending worldwide on Twitter.

On 22 October 2017, the Civil Society Network organised a protest demanding justice and calling for the immediate resignation of the Police Commissioner and the Attorney General.

Both Muscat and Delia expressed frustration over her death, viewing it as a representation of the "collapse of democracy and freedom of expression" Pope Francis sent a letter of condolence to the Maltese people. WikiLeaks founder Julian Assange announced that he would pay a €20,000 reward "for information leading to the conviction of Caruana Galizia's killers", stimulating the creation of additional crowdfunded campaigns and state-sanctioned rewards with similar goals.

In April 2018, a consortium of 45 international journalists published The Daphne Project, a collaboration between 18 news organizations including the locally syndicated newspaper Times of Malta, as well as The New York Times and The Guardian to complete her investigative work. In 2018 the European United Left–Nordic Green Left Award for Journalists, Whistleblowers & Defenders of the Right to Information was established in honor of Caruana Galizia.

In October 2019, as the second anniversary of the assassination approached, Civil Society organised a protest march, with the US Embassy issuing a statement, reiterating its offer to help Maltese investigators. Prime Minister Joseph Muscat insisted that the press misinterpreted this statement by the US embassy. Meanwhile, Dutch experts continued to help with Maltese investigations into the assassination, as the Netherlands Ministry for Foreign Affairs commemorated Caruana Galizia and echoed their commitment to free press and anti-corruption efforts:"Two years ago today the Maltese journalist #DaphneCaruanaGalizia was murdered in a heinous attack on freedom of expression.

There can be no democracy without a free and independent press. Let justice for journalism be served and set an example for everyone."

~ Netherlands Ministry for Foreign Affairs, 16 October 2019

Keith Schembri and 17 Black 
On 11 November 2019, Muscat's chief of staff, Keith Schembri, dropped a libel case against Simon Busuttil, in order to avoid testifying about 17 Black, a shell company based in Dubai, which had become implicated with the Panama Papers.  This decision was made in defiance of judiciary orders, but Muscat supported Schembri's decision not to testify, stating as justification that: 1) he had already sat down with the Caruana Galizia family to reach an agreement on a public inquiry into the assassination; and 2) such testimony by Schembri could constitute a conflict of interest, or prejudice the investigation into 17 Black.

A Financial Intelligence Analysis Unit (FIAU) report had identified the owner of 17 Black to be power station investor and Tumas Group CEO Yorgen Fenech, who has a clear link to Muscat and Tourism Minister Konrad Mizzi, through mutual investment into a new gas-fired power station, since 2013 or earlier. Fenech's ownership of 17 Black was corroborated by banking records acquired by Reuters from sources in the United Arab Emirates familiar with 17 Black.  This FIAU intelligence report furthermore identified, in a leaked email, that 17 Black was "one of two sources of income for the Panama companies Hearnville and Tillgate", which were "set up by OPM consultants Nexia BT for Dr Mizzi and the Prime Minister's chief of staff Keith Schembri". 17 Black allegedly planned to pay $5,000 a day to these two Panama companies owned by Schembri and Mizzi. Fenech denied any connection to Panama companies and even declined to comment about his ownership of 17 Black; Mizzi denied any connection to 17 Black; Muscat and Schembri denied any knowledge of 17 Black's ownership.

Middleman arrest 
On 19 November 2019, Muscat announced that he had written to Melvin Theuma, an alleged middleman in the Caruana Galizia murder case, offering him a pardon in exchange for exhaustive information detailing those involved in the assassination plot, following Theuma's arrest during the previous week (on a separate case). Muscat claimed that this was "the beginning of the end" of the investigation.

Fenech's arrest and Schembri's resignation 
Early on 20 November 2019, Fenech was intercepted at sea by an Armed Forces of Malta (AFM) patrol boat, while allegedly attempting to flee the country on his private yacht, one day after Theuma's presidential pardon. Six days later, Schembri resigned from his post as chief of staff, was questioned by police, and was released on police bail. Fenech first attempted to gain immunity in exchange for information; when immunity was denied, and an indictment filed against him on 30 November 2019, he pled not guilty. Fenech's defense primarily revolves around accusing Schembri of being the mastermind behind the Caruana Galizia murder, and of even extorting Fenech to frame Christian Cardona as the responsible party for the assassination. The case remains ongoing.

Protests

21 November 2019
On 20 November, civil society groups led by Repubblika, Occupy Justice, and manueldelia.com, announced a protest in front of the Prime Minister's Office, Auberge de Castille, calling for Muscat's resignation. In their statement, the groups said that Muscat should have demanded Schembri and Mizzi's resignations when their names first appeared in the 2016 Panama Papers release. The groups said they did not invite the Nationalist Party, or any other party, for the demonstration, but they would not oppose anyone wanting to join. At the end of the protest, protestors walked to the makeshift memorial to Caruana Galizia at the foot of the Great Siege Memorial. Those present then gathered outside Parliament, shouting "barra, barra" (out, out) and "Mafia, Mafia" at Government politicians. At the same time, opposition members of parliament (MPs) walked out of Parliament over Muscat's failure to dismiss Schembri and Mizzi. As pressure for their resignations mounted, Muscat insisted he was protecting no-one. Muscat reiterated there was no evidence linking politicians to the Caruana Galizia assassination. Muscat admitted that questions about Schembri's “business plans” with Fenech were legitimate.

Protesters also assembled in the streets around the Parliament buildings, heckling and stopping a number of ministers' cars from leaving the area. Justice Minister Owen Bonnici's car was targeted by protesters as it left parliament, with the Minister describing how he stood by the Police Force, two of whom sustained minor injuries in the course of doing their duties. In a statement, Speaker Anġlu Farrugia said steps ought to be taken against those who exceeded limits and manifestly breached the law, including through the use of violence.

22 November 2019
On 21 November, another protest was called for 22 November in front of Auberge de Castille. The organising groups stated that Muscat needed to shoulder political responsibility because had Muscat not failed to have Schembri and Mizzi removed, "Daphne Caruana Galizia would still be alive." The groups said that “to protect his friends, Joseph Muscat [...] suffocated the rule of law, allowed impunity to be sown and as a result seen Malta reaping violence." Honest MPs on both sides of Parliament were asked to remove “the corrupt and the accomplices of murderers” while embarking on a “cleansing of public life” in Malta.

Thousands of protestors met in front of the Auberge de Castille, renewing calls for Muscat to resign, saying that justice for Caruana Galizia was being stifled. Organisers appealed for calm, after a police officer was injured on Wednesday during a similar protest.

25 November 2019
Another protest was called for 25 November 2019. That day pressure continued to mount for Mizzi and Schembri's resignation, with cabinet members commenting publicly on the need for the country not to protect murderers and money launderers, while Malta's reputation was suffering "almost irreparable" damage. Faced with the pressure, Mizzi insisted "I stand tall... I have nothing to do with this case," while Schembri refused to comment. Fake €5,000 banknotes were thrown at Parliament, while peaceful protesters chanted “barra" [out] and "ħallelin, postkom ġo Kordin" (thieves, you belong in prison). Three rows of steel barricades kept protesters away from Parliament, while Muscat was jeered after exiting parliament at the end of Monday evening's parliamentary session.

26 November 2019

As the investigation into the Caruana Galizia murder continued, following further pressure, first Schembri and then Mizzi resigned from office. Schembri then faced questioning by police over allegations of his involvement in the Caruana Galizia case. Another minister, Chris Cardona, suspended himself in the wake of other police investigations. Prime Minister Muscat thanked Schembri, saying "I thank Keith for his hard work, he played a crucial role." A protest was held next to Parliament, hours after these political resignations. Parliament descended briefly into chaos as opposition MPs shouted "mafia" at Government benches, foreign affairs minister Carmelo Abela and parliamentary secretary for the elderly Anthony Agius Decelis were restrained by fellow Labour MPs after they crossed the floor. They were riled by opposition Nationalist MPs shouting "thieves, mafia." Prime Minister Muscat attempted to calm MPs, but the chaotic scenes escalated when he entered parliament. The resignations sparked a governmental crisis. Hundreds of people gathered outside cried "shame on you" and "killers", with the angry crowd pelting ministerial cars with eggs and coins as they left. Muscat was shielded by security officers as he exited on his way to a Labour executive meeting in Hamrun. Protesters carried banners, flares, drums, megaphones, and flags to get their message across and shouted: "Daphne was right". The protest then moved from outside parliament to Castille Place, where protesters were addressed by Manuel Delia, one of the organisers, and other speakers. Protesters vowed they would protest until Muscat's resignation.

27 November 2019
Another demonstration called for Wednesday 27 November began as a protest march, ending in front of Auberge de Castille. This was the fifth protest in less than a week. Following the disturbances of 26 November, steel barricades were placed in front of parliament, Auberge de Castille and on Merchants' Street, as police increased security ahead of the day's planned protest. On the day, both major political parties announced mass meetings for 1 December, with various civil society members and Caruana Galizia family members asking people to stay away from rallies organised by political parties. Both events were eventually cancelled.

The Institute of Maltese Journalists appealed the police to begin issuing press conferences to update journalists and media on developments in the Caruana Galizia case. Civil society had repeatedly questioned why news on the investigation filtered through from Muscat, and not from official police spokespersons.

After the main demonstration, protesters blocked traffic in Floriana as they demanded further resignations.

28 November 2019
An unannounced protest was held on 28 November, following reports of the release of Schembri from arrest. Fenech had claimed Schembri was responsible for the Caruana Galizia assassination in October 2017.

29 November 2019 
In the early hours of the morning on 29 November, after the protest which began in the evening the previous day, unknown security officials clashed with demonstrators and journalists were forcibly kept within the Ambassadors' Hall in Auberge de Castille. Maltese and foreign journalists were kept against their will after attending a press conference organised at 3 a.m. Tensions escalated after the security officials refused to identify themselves to journalists, or tell them why they were not being let out of the building. The decision to keep journalists locked in the Ambassadors' Hall was condemned by the Institute of Maltese Journalists.

University lecturers and students blocked parts of the road around the Msida skatepark in protest on Friday, 29 November, in a protest organised by the Kunsill Studenti Universitarji (KSU). Holding placards reading "assassins", "blood is on your hands" and "Muscat kriminal" (Muscat is a criminal), they later moved their sit-in protest to Regional Road.

News broke that Muscat was named by Fenech in his first statement to the police. Before the protest, police were briefed and reminded of their duty to protect the protesters.

Protesters began a protest march in Valletta at 6:30 p.m., holding posters and Maltese flags while protesting at the government's handling of the criminal investigation. The protest followed news earlier in the day of Muscat's imminent resignation. After the main protest, a smaller crowd gathered beneath the Great Siege Monument in front of the Daphne memorial where flowers and candles were left in tribute.

30 November 2019
Moviment Graffiti organised a protest in the morning, with organisers saying that there was "nothing socialist, leftist or progressive about what the government had allowed to happen over the past few years, despite the fact that the Labour Party was supposed to hold true to these values." Protesters reiterated calls for Muscat to resign following the Caruana Galizia probe, and they were joined in their protest by author and activist Immanuel Mifsud, and Arnold Cassola, amongst other politicians, NGOs, academics and activists.

On the day, MaltaToday published a photo of Schembri with the alleged middleman in the assassination plot, Melvin Theuma, at the Prime Minister's office in Castille.

1 December 2019 
Thousands of people descended on Valletta on Sunday, 1 December, demanding Muscat's resignation. Marching to shouts "Daphne was right," "Justice," and "Assassins," protesters insisted that Muscat was not their prime minister. Close to 20,000 protesters filled Republic Street in Valletta, by far the largest turnout at the time in weeks of protests aimed at Muscat's government. A protest march started in front of Parliament at 4 p.m. and moved to the square in front of the law courts, where protesters were addressed by activists. The protest was the largest one so far, with the pressure mounting on Muscat to step down. The protest came hours after an emergency meeting of the Labour Party parliamentary group gave Muscat free-rein to decide on his exit. The crowd was addressed by anthropologist Ranier Fsadni, Eve Borg Bonello, a 16-year-old student, and former Nationalist Party president Mark Anthony Sammut.

Late in the evening on 1 December, Muscat announced his plan to resign on national television. Muscat stated that he would stay in office for a further 42 days. Caruana Galizia family members, the Chamber of Advocates, law experts, Moviment Graffitti, and other critics feared that Muscat's insistence on remaining in office was a conflict of interest with investigations into suspects closely associated with him ongoing. Muscat insisted that "the case showed that Malta's institutions work and everyone is equal before the law."

Several plainclothes policemen were seen in strategic positions in Valletta taking pictures and footage of the protesters, some were seen walking with the crowd and taking pictures during the anti-corruption protest. Police surveillance was contested by a legal association, who stated it will continue to document such cases and to share its analysis with Amnesty International and European counterparts.

Eve Borg Bonello, a 16-year old speaker at the protest, received death threats and insults for her speech during the 1 December protest. Upon reporting these threats to the police, a policeman advised Borg Bonello to "keep her opinions to herself." While acknowledging this may have been a well-meaning piece of advice, she returned to the same police station assisted by a lawyer, to file an official police report.

2 December 2019

On Monday, 2 December 2019, access to Valletta's Freedom Square was heavily restricted as activists began to gather in front of parliament for the evening protest. Police also asked businesses located on Republic Street and Ordnance Street to close early in anticipation of the protest. Authorities laid out hundreds of metres of steel barricades in the square in front of parliament in the afternoon, considerably limiting the area in which civil society activists were able to protest. Opposition MPs walked out of Parliament, saying they will not attend any function with Muscat as prime minister. Protesters blocked politicians from leaving the Parliament building during the demonstration and demanded the resignation the Prime Minister. Protesters threw carrots and eggs – an allusion to the murder suspect Fenech – at MPs including Gozo minister Justyne Caruana. While trapped in Parliament, some Government MPs began taking selfies and communicating with their supporters on social media. Protesters also wanted the Prime Minister to take the political responsibility for the death of Caruana Galizia.

All three of Caruana Galizia's sons were present at the protest. Protesters blocked all exits from Parliament, trapping MPs for a couple of hours between Ordnance Street and Freedom Square in Valletta. Protesters taunted the Prime Minister to come out, while Muscat was giving his final speech in parliament ahead of resigning in January 2020. Unable to exit from the main streets around Parliament, some MPs were forced to escape via tunnels linking Parliament with the Valletta Ditch. The lights in the ditch were switched off to distract protesters and their aim, with Muscat leaving Parliament from the basement exit. One of the organisers then moved the protest to Castille, with the MPs allowed to leave Parliament by the crowd.

A journalist was assaulted by staff members of the Parliamentary Secretary for Agriculture, Fisheries and Animal Rights Clint Camilleri, as she attempted to ask whether he believed the Prime Minister ought to resign immediately. In a sign of the increased tension, Nationalist MP Karol Aqulina and Labour MP Clifton Grima started pushing each other, although they were quickly separated by people surrounding the two men. They shook hands afterwards.

Later in the day, the Office of the Prime Minister located at Auberge de Castille was also egged.

Some kilometres away from the protest, government supporters turned up in Hamrun, in front of the Labour Party's headquarters, in an unofficial rally in support of Muscat.

The Institute of Maltese Journalists condemned the violence and intimidation towards journalists at the demonstration in front of the Labour Party headquarters, as well as by government staff during the civil society protests in Valletta.

3 December 2019
Early on Tuesday, 3 December, protesters greeted Prime Minister Muscat as he entered Castille, calling for his immediate resignation. Muscat was meeting with a delegation of the European Parliament dispatched to Malta for an urgent mission following a political crisis sparked by developments in the Caruana Galizia murder investigation. Justice Minister Bonnici and Muscat were egged on their way to meet the Members of the European Parliament (MEPs) at Castille. The square next to Auberge de Castille was then locked down by police barricades.

Breaking news suggested the Prime Minister had remained in contact with Fenech via regular text messages. Muscat had claimed to have last met Fenech more than a year ago, but the Prime Minister recently admitted to at least one social meeting in February 2019. Fenech sent the messages when he was already the prime suspect under investigation, with Muscat being fully briefed by the security services.

Further news revelations indicated how two members of staff from the Office of the Prime Minister were allegedly mentioned in the middleman's testimony, with a former member of Muscat's security detail tried to pass on a message to the men accused of murdering Caruana Galizia.

In the evening, protesters assembled outside the police headquarters building in Floriana. They demanded that the police arrest and interrogate Keith Schembri, the prime minister's former chief of staff, for his connection to the murder investigation of Daphne Caruana Galizia. A large copy of a letter written by the alleged middleman in the assassination plot was attached to the closed gates of the headquarters. In it, the middleman named both Schembri and Yorgen Fenech as being part of the plot. Protesters held European Union (EU) and Maltese flags and sometimes shouting "mafia" and throwing fake €5,000 notes demanding the interrogation of Muscat and the arrest of Schembri. Protesters thanked the police on duty, particularly for not putting six rows of barricades in front of protesters, as had happened in Valletta some days earlier.

On 4 December, Parliament adjourned for its traditional Christmas recess amid great political turmoil. Opposition MPs boycotted the last sessions of Parliament as Muscat refused to resign immediately, with Parliament unanimously approving the Budget estimates in a marathon vote session. Muscat took a selfie with Government MPs at the end of the sitting.

7 December 2019
Maltese living or working in London, United Kingdom, organised a protest for 7 December in Parliament Square. Frustrated by a sense of helplessness, organisers aimed to draw international attention to the situation in Malta. Dozens of activists carried placards, and held banners, calling for Muscat's immediate resignation. On the day, Muscat attended a private audience with Pope Francis at the Vatican, with the meeting being shifted from an official visit to a private audience after a number of protests and letters were written asking the Pope not to meet with Muscat. Italian Prime Minister Giuseppe Conte cancelled a lunch with Muscat, opting for a private meeting at Palazzo Chigi instead.

8 December 2019

Another protest was called for Sunday, 8 December, demanding the immediate resignation of Muscat, and the investigation of all those named in the unfolding criminal investigations. The protest received the endorsement of leading independent news organisations in Malta, notably Times of Malta, The Malta Independent, Malta Today, Shift News, LovinMalta, as well as civil society organisation such as Aditus, Moviment Graffitti and KSU. Fewer policemen and barriers were prepared by security organisers than in previous demonstrations. Thousands walked on Castille in a protest march led by Caruana Galizia's parents, carrying flags, placards and chanting calls for justice and against corruption. The crowd was then addressed by Andre Callus from Moviment Graffitti, who called for an end to the blind partisanship that led Malta to this situation and that Muscat's unparalleled defence of Schembri left a "bad stench" in Castille. Christian Pace – an LGBT activist – addressed the crowd, and insisted the LGBT community was not "a catchphrase", and that he was shocked that Muscat kept promoting the LGBT successes of his government right up to his last weeks. Addressing the crowd, former Partit Nazzjonalista candidate Norman Vella linked the stories coming out of the court proceedings directly with the Office of the Prime Minister. With Theuma's testimony, it was now clear public funds were used to pay for the assassination. Closing the demonstration, Manuel Delia insisted that the two candidates for parliamentary leadership had insulted the country by not apologising to the Caruana Galizia family. Muscat, he said, was an agent of a Mafia who did not want to have anything change after his resignation.

9 December 2019

Early in the morning, Moviment Graffitti staged a sit-in at Castille demanding Muscat's immediate resignation, storming into the Prime Minister's Office building from a side entrance. In a peaceful protest, around 25 activists entered Castille with drums and whistles, chanting "shame on you'", "mafia", "criminals" and "barra." Activists made no attempt to enter the administrative office areas, and Muscat was not in the building. The offices were guarded by AFM soldiers, with more arriving when the protest began, without intervening.

When journalists arrived to cover the scene, protesters were locked inside the entrance hall, with the photographers and reporters moved out by security officers. Police officers said they were acting on "orders". The police stopped Caruana Galizia family members from joining the sit-in protest, while protesters blocked the street outside Castille. Government supporting media reported that a soldier was injured in the sit-in after being shoved against a wall, and that an activist had urinated at Castille. These claims were debunked and denied by Moviment Graffitti.

12 December 2019
As the middleman in the murder of Caruana Galizia was testifying in court, the Maltese community in Belgium staged a protest outside the Maltese Permanent Representation to the EU at Dar Malta in Brussels. This coincided with the opening of the European leaders' summit meeting, which was attended by the Prime Minister. Protesters demanded justice for the assassinated journalist, amidst reports that other European heads of state were uncomfortable with Muscat's presence at the European Summit. There were claims staff members of the embassy also joined the protest. A large poster of Daphne Caruana Galizia was placed on the main doorway.

Justice Minister Bonnici confirmed that Schembri had always been present at briefings on the murder of Caruana Galizia. He said he would feel "betrayed" if the allegations that Fenech knew what was going on in those meetings were true.

13 December 2019
On 11 December, a protest was called by NGOs for Friday, 13 December – coinciding with Republic Day, a national holiday in Malta. Insisting that Republic Day belonged to the people, NGOs encouraged people to attend. There were fears that the protest, coinciding with the official ceremonies, would clash with the official events marking the day. Overnight, a group of protesters stood guard on the makeshift memorial to Caruana Galizia, holding a vigil throughout the night, to ensure that the memorial was not removed again by Government employees.

During the protest, police presence was heavy to ensure the peace between protesters and Maltese celebrating Republic Day, in particular around Castille.  President George Vella, on his way to the Grandmaster's Palace for the official ceremonies, was greeted with both applause and jeers, with the crowd protesting, whistling and chanting throughout a military parade along Republic Street. Protesters lined the streets, from Parliament through to St George's Square. The President was booed and fake money was thrown towards his car.

Ahead of the official ceremony, President Vella appealed for unity, describing the current events as "very particular circumstances," and that Malta was far bigger than the "gang of people" who have brought shame on the country.

In a statement, Moviment Graffitti said that "the two main political parties exerting huge control over [Maltese] society and institutions, and which prioritise their party’s lust for power over the interests of the people," asking all Maltese to take the opportunity to bring about a real change, and not a superficial one.

Home Affairs Minister Michael Farrugia insisted NGOs and protesters did not apply for a permit for the protests on Republic Day, while a Police statement admitted a meeting was held between the NGOs and police authorities two days before the protests to discuss civil society's role in the official ceremonies. Manuel Delia, one of the 13 December protest organisers, began court proceedings against the Labour Party's television channel and news journalists after claims protesters aimed their heckles and "violent protests" at Special Olympics athletes. Delia viewed the news coverage to be "untrue", "defamatory and libellous"  and aimed to "put him in danger."

16 December 2019
On 16 December, NGO organiser Repubblika have asked for the President Vella's protection in view of an intimidation campaign, asking Vella's intervention with the authorities, to restrain confrontation, and confirm the non-violent nature of the protests. Organisers have said that protesters received death threats, and asked Vella to call on the Police Commissioner to obey the law, and have stated the NGO's members do not "feel protected by the Police Commissioner and the entire force." A vigil marking the 26th month since Caruana Galizia assassination was held in front of the makeshift memorial in Valletta, with the groups restating their commitment to protest until justice was made for Caruana Galizia and corruption removed from Government. Addressing the crowd, Vicki Ann Cremona warned that the same "demonisation campaign" against Caruana Galizia was now being applied to the NGOs and the organisers of repeated protests calling for the prime minister's resignation. Cremona said activists were being falsely accused of disrespecting the armed forces, the police and a paralympics contingent in 13 December protest. This slander led to "hate speech" and threats towards activists. Other speakers included Manuel Delia, and members from the Chance Civil Hub Against Organised Crime in Europe.

5 January 2020
On 5 January, a national anti-corruption protest themed "New Republic New Malta", organised by Repubblika, Occupy Justice and Manuel Delia, took place in Valletta. Rumours spread that at an 11 January meeting of Repubblika, the group might transform into a political party. Vicki Ann Cremona of Repubblika and Manuel Delia denied the rumour, stating that becoming a political party would be contrary to the group's aim of achieving "the rule of law". Cremona called for Muscat and "his criminal gang" to resign from parliament.

November 2020
Unable to hold a public meeting due to the COVID-19 pandemic, banners to commemorate the first anniversary of the protests carrying photos of politicians and criticising some for being in denial and not providing answers despite a number of resignations and early retirements, were erected. before many were quickly removed by persons unknown.

Reactions

Reactions in Malta 

The President of Malta George Vella appealed for calm and unity, and asked to allow time for the institutions to work, saying that "Malta deserves better." The President cancelled a number of engagements, both locally and abroad, in light of the national crisis.

Constituted bodies and unions issued varied calls, with some asking for Muscat to step down and others prompting a more measured reaction asking for calm and maturity.

Michael Falzon, a government MP, accused protests of destabilising the country and the economy, accusing protesters of seeking bloodshed with their boycotts and protests, aiming to have "another martyr." The same MP insisted the 2 December protest was not a protest but "sedition", showing a jacket he wore for that evening's sitting with egg-stains. He said that these items as well as bags of urine were being thrown by a mob which included two Opposition MPs. Journalists attending the protest insisted that they saw protesters throw eggs, coins, carrots and (fake) cash at MPs, but not any urine.

The Minister for Education, Evarist Bartolo, in a series of almost daily comments, reiterated that it was "not acceptable that people with money use politics, criminals to hijack country." Another government MP, Silvio Schembri, insisted that his loyalties lie with the Labour Party, and not with any other institution.

Home Affairs Minister Michael Farrugia insisted that "aggressive behaviour" and "obscene language" should not be used during the protests. Farrugia listed a number of violent incidents during the protest, including the injury of a policemen, threats, damages to official cars, the blocking of official cars by protesters, the throwing of urine bags at MPs, a sit-in protest at the Office of the Prime Minister and the injury of a soldier. Claims about throwing of urine bags could not be verified by journalists, while Moviment Graffitti insisted the soldier was not injured in its protest, but had stumbled and slipped on a ledge in the hallway.

Candidate for the leadership of the Labour Party Robert Abela claimed that the only purpose of the protests was provocation. Opposition MEP Roberta Metsola replied that "Provocation is assassinating your critics, allowing the mafia to take over, protecting criminals for years, looting our nation. Provocation is sending in the army for a dozen activists, barricading public spaces [and] conducting vile disinformation campaigns". Opposition MEP David Casa said that the idea that Muscat should hold on to power was "insane", that Malta was on the precipice and that "a government that murders its own citizens has absolutely no place in the European Union." Labour Party MEP Alex Agius Saliba insisted that the activists are "extremists" aiming at "destabilising the country." Agius Saliba called for measures to "put an end to this madness", saying the "country cannot be ruled by a few people who set themselves above the law." Moreover, he also equated "civil disobedience" with "anarchy."

Former Chief Justice and former Judge of the European Court of Human Rights Vincent A. De Gaetano described the situation as an "institutional crisis" rather than a constitutional one, as the crisis affects other organs and actors which may not necessarily emanate from the Constitution, such as the "police force, political parties and the myriad regulatory bodies and public authorities and entities that keep being created." De Gaetano insists that the President has a "moral duty" to act and denounce whatever is eroding the Constitution.

As protests in Malta intensified, the Bishops of Malta and the Bishop of Gozo appealed for national unity, urging people "not to fall into trap of hatred, lies and violence."

The Malta Chamber of Commerce called on President Vella to be "a force that brings about balance and statesmanship during these troubled times," a call echoing that from a constitutional law expert.

Government authorities continued to remove a makeshift memorial to Caruana Galizia in front of the Law Courts, even a few hours after protesters leave flowers and photographs. When asked, workers cleaning the monument simply claimed they were receiving "orders from above".

Grassroots Labour Party supporters continued to support Muscat's decisions, with the leading partner of Nexia BT, the company which opened the Panama companies for Schembri and Mizzi, saying Muscat is "the best that ever was and that ever will be."

On Nationalist Party owned media, Net News, reported that Muscat was isolated in Europe, using a blurred photo of Muscat sitting alone at a conference table in Brussels. General Workers' Union owned newspaper, It-Torċa, then used photos of Muscat with EU leaders from 2018 to imply that Muscat was welcomed during the December summit.

Muscat's farewell tour 
On 8 December 2019, Muscat began his "farewell tour" of Labour voters, visiting supporters in Naxxar, Żebbuġ and Paola. He insisted he did what he believed was right, claiming to have "shouldered responsibility, perhaps more than what was needed". On 15 December 2019, Muscat visited supporters in Gozo, saying he pledged his "unconditional support" to the next PL leader, saying that while some protests were "just" and part of his public life, other protests, like those aimed at the armed forces, were "unfair."

International reactions 
The EU confirmed that it would send a mission to Malta to investigate the state of the rule of law in the country, referencing Caruana Galizia's case. The President of the EU Commission Ursula von der Leyen said the Commission is following the situation in Malta very closely.
In December 2019, a European Parliament (EP) fact finding mission called for Muscat's immediate resignation, with its leading MEP saying she was "not reassured", claiming trust between the EU and Malta was seriously damaged and that Muscat had not allayed her concerns. EU Justice Commissioner Didier Reynders cited his "big concern" about Malta. The EU also pressured Malta to speed up its judicial reforms.

In December 2019, the EP piled further pressure on the commission, with a motion having MEPs "express their regret that the European Commission in recent years refrained from taking any concrete measures towards the [Maltese] government," with developments in Malta in recent years leading to a "serious and persistent threats to the rule of law, democracy and fundamental rights." A resolution was passed with a large majority at the EP, which called on Muscat to resign immediately over the Caruana Galizia case, questioning the "integrity and credibility" of the murder investigation with Muscat in government.

MEP Sven Giegold called on the EU to begin suspension procedures against Malta under Article 7 of the treaty on EU, recommending the opening of an investigation into the rule of law and various policy decisions taken by the Muscat government. This step was reportedly seen by the commission as a viable option for the Maltese situation.

The President of the European Parliament David Sassoli passed on a letter by the EU mission in Malta to European leaders urging them to take a stance on Malta following "alarming" findings made by the mission in early December, with the letter calling for Muscat's immediate resignation. The head of the EPP, Manfred Weber, insisted it was a "huge scandal" that Muscat remained in office, saying that he should have resigned immediately.

With Finland holding the EU Council's rotating presidency, Finnish European Affairs Minister Tytti Tupparainen said she was concerned by the rule of law situation in Malta. Dutch Prime Minister Mark Rutte told reporters that he had had "a long conversation" with Muscat, emphasising "that, pending his departure as prime minister, it is important that a separation of his office in Malta and the further prosecution [of the murder] is guaranteed, that this is crucial." Muscat assured Rutte that "this was the case," with Rutte saying he "will now try to keep an eye on this as much as possible.” Charles Michel, the EU council president, however, said that the Caruana Galizia murder investigation was not discussed during the two day summit in December 2019.

Reporters Without Borders UK director Rebecca Vincent underscored the lack of political accountability in Malta around the case, as well as the problems relating to rule of law and freedom of expression.

Carlo Bonini, an Italian mafia expert and author of a book on the investigations carried out by Caruana Galizia, described Malta as a "mafia-state [...] revealing how democracies can degenerate."

See also 
 2019 Malta political crisis
 The Daphne Project
 Politics of Malta
 European Centre for Press and Media Freedom
 Murder of Ján Kuciak

Notes

References 

Maltese protests
Maltese protests
2019 Malta political crisis
Political history of Malta
November 2019 events in Malta
December 2019 events in Malta
Protests in the European Union
Protests in Malta
2019 controversies